Łukowa may refer to the following places:
Łukowa, Lesser Poland Voivodeship (south Poland)
Łukowa, Lublin Voivodeship (east Poland)
Łukowa, Świętokrzyskie Voivodeship (south-central Poland)
Łukowa, Subcarpathian Voivodeship (south-east Poland)